A partial lunar eclipse occurred on Tuesday, July 25, 1972 and Wednesday, July 26, 1972, the second of two lunar eclipses in 1972 with an umbral eclipse magnitude of 0.54271. A partial lunar eclipse occurs when the Earth moves between the Sun and Moon but the three celestial bodies do not form a straight line in space. When that happens, a small part of the Moon's surface is covered by the darkest, central part of the Earth's shadow, called the umbra. The rest of the Moon is covered by the outer part of the Earth's shadow called the penumbra. The moon's apparent diameter was 3.2 arcseconds smaller than the January 30, 1972 lunar eclipse.

Visibility
The partial eclipse was visible in Australia, Pacific, Americas, western Africa, seen rising over eastern Australia on the evening on Wednesday, July 26, 1972 (Tuesday, July 25, 1972 in west of International Date Line) and setting over Atlantic on morning of Wednesday, July 26, 1972.

Relation to other lunar eclipses

Eclipses in 1972
 An annular solar eclipse on Sunday, 16 January 1972.
 A total lunar eclipse on Sunday, 30 January 1972.
 A total solar eclipse on Monday, 10 July 1972.
 A partial lunar eclipse on Wednesday, 26 July 1972.

Lunar year series

Half-Saros cycle
A lunar eclipse will be preceded and followed by solar eclipses by 9 years and 5.5 days (a half saros). This lunar eclipse is related to two total solar eclipses of Solar Saros 145.

See also
List of lunar eclipses
List of 20th-century lunar eclipses

Notes

External links

1972-07
1972 in science
July 1972 events